

Erwin Sander (5 March 1892  – 7 December 1962) was a general in the Wehrmacht of Nazi Germany during World War II who commanded several divisions. He was a recipient of the Knight's Cross of the Iron Cross.

Awards

 Knight's Cross of the Iron Cross on 3 September 1942 as Generalmajor and commander of 170. Infanterie-Division

References

Citations

Bibliography

 

1892 births
1962 deaths
Lieutenant generals of the German Army (Wehrmacht)
German Army personnel of World War I
Prussian Army personnel
Recipients of the Knight's Cross of the Iron Cross
Military personnel from Berlin
People from the Province of Brandenburg
German police officers
Recipients of the clasp to the Iron Cross, 1st class
20th-century Freikorps personnel
German Army generals of World War II